Berislav Rončević (born 23 June 1960) is a Croatian politician, and the former Minister of Internal Affairs in the government of Croatia and the Minister of Defense.

Rončević was born in the village of Borovik near Đakovo. He graduated from the Faculty of Law, University of Zagreb in 1985.

Rončević has been a member of the Croatian Democratic Union (HDZ) since 1990. He began his political career in the party in the town of Našice, and afterwards within the Osijek-Baranja County. He was assistant to the mayor, and later mayor of Našice himself. He has been a representative in the Parliament of Croatia since 2000. After parliamentary elections in 2003 he took on the portfolio of defence minister.

In December 2010, Rončević was sentenced to four years in prison for alleged improprieties during acquisition of army trucks in 2004. After his guilty verdict was vacated by the Supreme Court in April 2013, Rončević was acquitted in the second trial in January 2014.

Rončević is married and a father of four.

References

1960 births
Living people
Representatives in the modern Croatian Parliament
Croatian Democratic Union politicians
Defence ministers of Croatia
Interior ministers of Croatia
Faculty of Law, University of Zagreb alumni
Croatian politicians convicted of crimes